On Our Selection is a 1920 Australian silent film directed by Raymond Longford based on the Dad and Dave stories by Steele Rudd.

Plot
Mrs Rudd and the younger of her six children go and join Dad Rudd and his son Dave on the family's selection, where Dad and Dave have built a slab and mud hut. The family adjusts to bush life and eventually make enough to buy a horse and plough. The farm progresses until set back by a year-long drought and bushfire.

Later, the eldest Rudd daughter, Kate, returns from teaching in the city. She romances neighbour Sandy Nelson, and they get married.

Cast
Percy Walshe as Dad Rudd
Tal Ordell as Dave Rudd
Beatrice Esmond as Mrs Rudd
Arthur Greenaway as Sandy Taylor
Evelyn Johnson as Kate
Fred Coleman as Dan
Charlotte Beaumont as Sarah
Arthur Wilson as Joe
Olga Willard-Turton (credited as Olga Willard) as Nell
Nellie Bisellas Mrs Anderson
Carmen Coleman as Lily White
David Edelsten as parson

Production
Producer E. J. Carroll bought the rights to Rudd's stories for £500. He originally wanted American director Wilfred Lucas to make the film, but he refused as he felt the subject matter was too intrinsically Australian.

Carroll did not have the rights to Bert Bailey's play adaptation of the stories, so the script comes directly from Steele Rudd's original works. This means it does not feature additions made by the play, such subplots involving murder and a love triangle.

Longford cast many non professional actors in support roles to give the film more authenticity. The actor who played Cranky Jack was discovered at Circular Quay.

Longford later said:
The  true  art  of  acting  is  not  to  act and  that’s  what  I  have  dinned  into  the  ears  of  my  characters,  and  I think  it  has  had  its  effect  in  the  natural ness  of  my  pictures. If  I  am  producing Australian  stuff,  I  want  it  to  be  Australian,  and  the  average  Australian  is  a  casual  carelessly  natural  beggar... In  my  opinion, the  stage  production  sacrificed  all  that  was  human  and  appealing,  in  attempting  to  be  dramatic. No   stage   atmosphere   for   me,   nothing   artificial   I   like   realism,   and   I   think   I   get  it. 
Filming took place in June 1920.

Longford's regular collaborator Lottie Lyell was ill during the making of the film and thus had little to do with its production. The movie was mostly shot on location in Baulkham Hills near Sydney with outdoor scenes, including the bushfire, shot at Leeton.

The film was far less broad than most rural comedies of the time.

Reception
The film was successful at the box office and was followed by a sequel, Rudd's New Selection (1921).

References

External links

On Our Selection at National Film and Sound Archive
On Our Selection at Australian Screen Online

1920 films
Australian drama films
Australian silent feature films
Australian black-and-white films
Films directed by Raymond Longford
Films based on works by Steele Rudd
1920 drama films
Silent drama films
1920s English-language films